Zhang Ying (born June 27, 1985) is a Chinese football player who competed in the 2004 Summer Olympics.

In 2004, she finished ninth with the Chinese team in the women's tournament. She played in one match.

External links
Profile

1985 births
Living people
Chinese women's footballers
China women's international footballers
Footballers at the 2004 Summer Olympics
Footballers at the 2008 Summer Olympics
Olympic footballers of China
2007 FIFA Women's World Cup players
Footballers from Shanghai
Women's association football defenders